Ricardo León Brito (born 8 February 1983), sometimes known simply as Ricardo, is a Spanish retired footballer who played as a central midfielder.

Football career
Born in Santa Cruz de Tenerife, León made his professional debuts with local club CD Tenerife in 2005–06's second division, and achieved La Liga promotion in his fourth year, being an essential element of the success. In his first season in the top flight he appeared in 29 games (all starts, two goals), but his team was immediately relegated back.

In mid-June 2011, with the Canary Islands side relegated to the third level, León signed a three-year contract with Sporting de Gijón. He played in just three league matches in his first year, with another relegation befalling.

References

External links

1983 births
Living people
Footballers from Santa Cruz de Tenerife
Spanish footballers
Association football midfielders
La Liga players
Segunda División players
Tercera División players
CD Tenerife B players
CD Tenerife players
Sporting de Gijón players